The human gene Chromosome 3 open reading frame 14 is a gene of uncertain function located at 3p14.2 near fragile site FRBA3—which falls between this gene and the centromere. Its protein is expected to localize to the nucleus and bind DNA. Orthologs have been identified in all of the major animal groups, minus amphibians and insects, tracing as far back as the sea anemone; indicating an origin of over 1000 mya, highlighting its importance in the animal genome.

Gene aliases 

C3orf14 is also known by the aliases LOC57415, FLJ94553 and FLJ17473. Gene orthologs found in other organisms are usually known by the name c3orf14-like, though some are known as LOC57415-like or HT021-like (protein name).

Structure 

The mRNA is composed of 6 exons, and encodes a 15007.84 kD protein known as HT021. This protein has a pre-modification isoelectric point of 5.57 and alpha helices span most of its length. Four sites of possible phosphorylation have been identified, and at least two sites of phosphorylation are conserved in all orthologs, as are two alpha helices. This protein is also predicted as a DNA binding protein. The protein may assume a tertiary structure of a coiled coil.

Homology 

Orthologs of this gene has been identified in most animal groups: mammals, monotremes, aves, reptiles, fish and invertebrates. Transcripts have not been identified in amphibians or insects; however only model organisms have been sequenced from these groups.  Very recently the first ortholog in reptiles was identified in Anolis carolinensis.  The amino acid structure is highly conserved through mammals, and the secondary and tertiary structure is highly conserved in all orthologs, dating as far back as 1000 mya in the sea anemone. No orthologs have been found in plants or bacteria.  Below is a phylogenetic tree generated in SDSC Biology Workbench showing protein similarity among species in which C3orf14 has been identified.

Expression 

This gene was first identified in the hypothalamic-pituitary-adrenal axis (HPA axis). The GEO and EST profiles in NCBI, indicate that its expression level varies from tissue to tissue; however its reported expression is 1.2 times that of the average gene. It has highest expression in the pancreas and nervous tissue (in humans). It is underexpressed in many cancer cell lines, however this may be due to its close proximity to the tumor suppressor gene FHIT, and the chromosomal fragile site FRBA3. Breakage at this site inactivates FHIT and can lead to the loss of C3orf14.

Function 
Because C3orf14 is not ubiquitously expressed, it most likely is not a housekeeping gene. Instead, it more likely plays a role in the function of specific tissues. It seems likely then, that this gene is a transcription factor, which regulates the expression of other genes important for the function of tissues where this gene is expressed highest.

References

External links 
 PubMed
 NCBI gene record
 GeneCards
 UCSC Genome Browser

Genes on human chromosome 3